Calkin is a surname. Notable people with the surname include:

Hervey C. Calkin, U.S. Representative from New York
John Baptiste Calkin, English composer, organist and music teacher
John Williams Calkin, mathematician
Samuel Calkin, American businessman, musician, a politician from Texas

See also
Calkins (surname)